The 1994 Volvo Women's Open was a women's tennis tournament played on outdoor hard courts at the Dusit Resort Hotel in Pattaya in Thailand that was part of Tier IV of the 1994 WTA Tour. It was the fourth edition of the tournament and was held from 11 April through 17 April 1994. First-seeded Sabine Appelmans won the singles title, her second at the event after 1992, and earned $18,000 first-prize money.

Finals

Singles

 Sabine Appelmans defeated  Patty Fendick 6–7(5–7), 7–6(7–5), 6–2
 It was Appelmans' 2nd singles title of the year and the 5th of her career.

Doubles

 Patty Fendick /  Meredith McGrath defeated  Yayuk Basuki /  Nana Miyagi 7–6(7–0), 3–6, 6–3

References

External links
 ITF tournament edition details 
 Tournament draws

 
 WTA Tour
 in women's tennis
Tennis, WTA Tour, Volvo Women's Open
Tennis, WTA Tour, Volvo Women's Open

Tennis, WTA Tour, Volvo Women's Open